Marcetella is a genus of flowering plants belonging to the family Rosaceae.

It is native to the Canary Islands and Madeira within Macaronesia .

The genus name of Marcetella is in honour of Adeodato Francisco Marcet (1875–1964), a Spanish clergyman, botanist and agronomist. Who also worked in a botanical garden in Blanes. It was first described and published in Bol. Inst. Nac. Invest. Agron. Vol.18 (Issue 95) on page 263 in 1948.

Species
According to Kew:
Marcetella maderensis 
Marcetella moquiniana

References

Rosaceae
Rosaceae genera
Plants described in 1948
Flora of the Canary Islands
Flora of Madeira